George Krug may refer to:
 George E. Krug, American architect
 George A. Krug, American lawyer, politician, and real estate broker from New York